Intermezzo criminal is a 1953 Argentine film directed by Luis Moglia Barth.

Cast
Olinda Bozán 		
Carlos Castro 	
Hugo Devieri 		
Dringue Farías 			
María Fernanda 			
Victoria Garabato 		
Ubaldo Martínez 			
Pablo Palitos 			
Teresita Pintos 			
Alberto Quiles 			
Domingo Sapelli 			
Maruja Soler 		
Enrique Zingoni

References

External links
 

1953 films
1950s Spanish-language films
Argentine black-and-white films
Films directed by Luis Moglia Barth
1950s Argentine films